Prawda  is a village in the administrative district of Gmina Michałowice, within Kraków County, Lesser Poland Voivodeship, in southern Poland.
The village is located in the historical region Galicia.

References

Prawda